Knowle is a village near Braunton located on the A361 road between Ilfracombe and Barnstaple in North Devon, England.  It is in the civil parish of Braunton. Knowle is situated near to the Iron Age fortification of Knowle Hill Castle.

History 
The number of people in Knowle expanded considerably in the 1960s with the building of a large number of bungalows which almost doubled the housing stock. As it was many who took up those early purchase were more likely to speak 'Brum' than westcountry...at the time there was a push for people from the Midlands to relocate to ease the housing issues under a policy known as 'over-spill' .  The estate of about 50 bungalows were built by the local builder 'Jimmy' James Dennis whose had all his own trades and workers and even ran his own sawmills and forestry to create the necessary wood. One old timer in the 90's, remembered cutting down the trees as a lad, having replanted the ground and then having cut down the trees that had grown in the intervening 50 years ...and replanting again. Jimmy lived on the small hill above the new houses towards the C of E but never had a problem with water for his garden or greenhouse...he had built a 'cistern' on the hill opposite,  fed by a simple pipe laid into a stream that emerged from the top of that hill  and laid a pipe right across the village to his house.

Knowle had two churches; C of E at the top of the hill (now closed) and a Methodist hall in the middle of the village. In the 1960s there was a small shop by the main road, separate post office, garage and a pub, the 'Ebrington Arms' but currently apart from the pub, the rest have been merged into the garage. In the 70's the pub was little changed from the way it had been built with a single room from each side of a central front door and a bar that extended into each room. In the 1980s the pub was extensively modified to cater for food services.  Jimmy Dennis's old yard continues as a yard  for several businesses but the trees are now safe.

About 0.5 miles from the village, at Winsham, there were three farms who maintained the fields with arable and dairy stocks. One of the farms used to provide a daily milk delivery service with both pasteurised and raw deliveries straight from the farm...probably from cow to cornflakes in about 2 hours !, [glass] bottled and delivered by the farmers wife, (Mrs Glanville and her mini van!) ...the blue tits loved the cream off the milk bottles.

A small holding just outside of the village was run by Mr and Mrs Petherick who supplied all the eggs you could want and the occasional chicken (a rare thing for a special Sunday lunch in the 60's) but she could also provide a [bred] rabbit as a pet... or for eating.

The village shop was run for years in the 60's and 70's  by Mr and Mrs Perryman and as people didn't have supermarkets or many cars, the small shop, the local farmer, the small holder and peoples own gardens, provided most of what people needed and for other items it was a bus ride to Braunton or all the way to Barnstaple...especially popular on Fridays, cattle market day and the Pannier Market. To complete the team, Mrs Fry ran the post office (and Sunday school) at the time and the Padisons ran the pub.

Also in the village at the time were Mrs Kirchoff who taught piano, Mr Shepherd who was a great painter and A.H. Slee a published historian who had written several books including one about Braunton. Mr Bray was the tech teacher who worked in a Barnstaple school but was known to shut himself in his garage to create working steam engines; Harry Rooke was Jummy Dennis's foreman and who got the houses built; Mr Gubb ran his 5 tonne lorry including the bricks, sand and cement for all the local building....a community, largely self-sufficient

The village came together throughout the year for different things but often as a result of the local Women's Institute, but especially to create the lorry floats for the children to enter the Braunton Carnival Parade...thousands of paper flowers must have been made in evenings over the years to decorate those floats.

The village layout has changed little since the 60's except for a small number of in-fills, replacements and renovations.

References

Villages in Devon
Braunton